Joshua Enelangi Tupou (born May 2, 1994) is an American football nose tackle for the Cincinnati Bengals of the National Football League (NFL). He played college football at Colorado.

Professional career

Tupou signed with the Cincinnati Bengals as an undrafted free agent on May 5, 2017. He was waived on September 2, 2017 and was signed to the practice squad the next day. He was promoted to the active roster on November 11, 2017. He was waived by the Bengals on November 21, 2017 and was signed to the practice squad the next day. He was promoted back to the active roster on December 6, 2017.

On November 22, 2018, Tupou was placed on injured reserve after suffering a torn pectoral in practice.

Tupou re-signed with the Bengals on May 1, 2020. On August 3, 2020, Tupou announced he would opt out of the 2020 season due to the COVID-19 pandemic.

On March 17, 2022, Tupou re-signed with the Bengals.

Tupou recorded his first career sack against the Miami Dolphins in week 4 of the 2022 season.

References

External links
Colorado Buffaloes bio
Cincinnati Bengals bio

1994 births
Living people
American football defensive tackles
Colorado Buffaloes football players
Cincinnati Bengals players
People from Buena Park, California
Players of American football from Long Beach, California
Sportspeople from Orange County, California
American people of Tongan descent